was a Japanese businessman-politician.

Takasaki was born in Takatsuki, Japan, on 7 February 1885. After finishing school in Japan, Takasaki spent his younger days in Manchuria, and was the chairman of Manchurian Industrial Development Company and the head of the All Manchurian Japanese Association located in Xinjing, waiting for the repatriation from Huludao.  Upon returning to Japan, he became the first chairman of Electric Power Development Company, the elected member of the House of Representatives of Japan, the head of the Japanese delegation to Asian–African Conference, the first head of the Economic Planning Agency of MITI, the initiator of the Sino-Japanese LT Trade Agreement, etc. 
He founded Toyo Seikan Kaisha in 1917, which has since become the largest container company in Japan and dominates the ASEAN market. He served in various Cabinet positions in the 1950s, including a period as Minister of International Trade and Industry from 1958 to 1959. From 1960 to 1962, Takasaki and China's Liao Chengzhi led the effort to expand trade relations between Japan and communist China, culminating in the signing of the Memorandum on Sino-Japanese Long-Term Comprehensive Trade (also known as the Liao-Takasaki Trade Agreement or simply the LT Trade Agreement). This agreement opened the way for the resumption of a small amount of "friendship" trade between the two nations, an important step on the path to the normalization of relations between Japan and China.

He died in Tokyo on 24 February 1964.

References

Further reading
Itoh, Mayumi (August 2012). Pioneers of Sino-Japanese Relations: Liao and Takasaki. Palgrave-MacMillan. .

See also
People's Republic of China – Japan relations
Politics of Manchukuo

1885 births
1964 deaths
People from Takatsuki, Osaka
Members of the House of Representatives (Japan)
20th-century Japanese businesspeople